The Bronx Executioner is the English title of the Italian cyborg film, Il Giustiziere del Bronx,  released in 1989.

Plot
In the post-apocalyptic Bronx, warring races of evil androids and humanoids battle each other for supremacy.

Trivia
A certain amount of footage from the 1984 film The Final Executioner was used in this film. Woody Strode's footage as the character Sam from The Final Executioner is re-used here and his character is now Warren. Margit Evelyn Newton was the only actor from the first film to have new scenes shot in the second.

Reception

Kim Newman found the film to be ghastly, finding it an inferior remake of the Final Executioner. Likewise, Creature Feature gave the movie 1 out of 5 stars.

References

External links

 Crustacean Hate!: Bronx Executioner (1989)

1989 films
1980s science fiction films
1980s Italian-language films
Italian post-apocalyptic films
Golan-Globus films
1980s Italian films